The Monument to the X-ray and Radium Martyrs of All Nations (also known as the X-ray Martyrs' Memorial) is a memorial in Hamburg, Germany, commemorating those who died due to their work with the use of radiation, particularly X-rays, in medicine.

When unveiled, the memorial included 169 names, from fifteen nations, listed alphabetically; by 1959 there were 359, with the additions listed on four separate stone plaques, beside the original columnar stone memorial.

Inscription 

The memorial's inscription may be translated as:

Book 

An accompanying book,  (Book of Honour of radiologists of all nations) gives biographies of those commemorated. Three editions have been produced, the most recent in 1992.

Names 

The names of those commemorated include:
 Heinrich Albers-Schönberg (1865–1921)
 Gustav Baer (1865–1925)
 Frederick Henry Baetjer (1874–1933)
 Burton Eugene Baker (1871–1913)
 Leonhard Baumeister (1874–1953)
 Eugen Beaujard (1874–1937)
 Jean Bergonié (1857–1925)
 Elis Berven (1885–1966)
 Reginald Blackall (-1925)
 Barry Blacken
 Joseph Boine (1883–1935)
 Percy Brown (?–1950)
 William Ironside Bruce (1879–1921)
 Eugene Wilson Caldwell (1870–1918)
 Joaquim Roberto Cavalho (1893–1944)
 Felipe Carriazo (1854–1919)
 Edmond Castex (1868–1931)
 Ettore Castronovo (1894–1954)
 Alfred Cerné (1856–1937)
 Frederick W. D. Collier 
 Antonio Coppola (?–1922)
 Maria Skłodowska-Curie (1867-1934)
 Alois Czepa (1886–1931)
 Fritz Dautwitz (1877–1932)
 Friedrich Dessauer (1881–1963)
 Étienne Destot (1864–1918)
 Walter Dodd (-1916)
 Jonn Duken (1889–1954)
 Gyula Elischer von Thurzóbánya (1875–1929)
 Arthur W. Erskine (1885–1952)
 Johan Frederik Fischer (1868–1922)
 Frederick R. Forster
 William Hope Fowler (1876–1933)
 Shigeo Furuya (1891–1955)
 Fritz Giesel (1852–1927)
  (1869–1938)
 Maximilian Gortan (1873–ca. 1936)
  (1874–1952)
 John Hall-Edwards (1858–1926)
 Anna Hamann (1894–1969)
 Joseph Gilbert Hamilton (1907–1957)
 Georges Haret (1874–1932)
 H. Harris
 Georg Heber (1872–1931)
 Guido Holzknecht (1872–1931)
 Hermann Hopf (-after 1928)
 Friedrich Janus (1875–1951)
  (1869–1926)
 Irène Joliot-Curie (1897–1956)
 James Philip Kerby (1886–1952)
 Friedrich Wilhelm Klingelfuss (1859–1932)
  (1873–1957)
 Charles Lester Leonard (1861–1913)
 Adolphe Leray (1865–1926)
  (1863–1929)
 Félix Lobligeois (1874–1941)
 Bertram V. A. Low-Beer (1900–1955)
 Cecil Lyster (1859–1920)
 Robert Hermann Machlett (1872–1926)
 Stanley Melville (1867–1934)
 Lawrie Morrison (-1933)
 José Casimiro Carteado Mena (1876–1949)
  (1845–1912)
 John Murphy(1885–1944)
 Takashi Nagai (1908–1951)
 George Harrison Orton (1873–1947)
 Ernest Payne (?–1936)
 George Alexander Pirie
 Mario Ponzio (1885–1956)
 James R. Riddell
  (1871–1916)
 Heber Robarts (1852–1922)
 Jacob Rosenblatt (1872–1928)
 Francis Le Roy Satterlee (1881–1935)
  (1879-1959)
 Erno Schiffer (1893-1951)
 Otto Schreiber (1882–1925)
 Fumiyo Shimadzu (1902–1967)
 Hilde Maier-Smereker (1893–1954)
 Ernst Sommer (1872–1938)
 Adrien Celestin Marie Soret (?–1929)
 John W. L. Spence (1870-1930)
 Itsuma Suetsugu (1893–1965)
 Auguste-Jean-Baptiste Tauleigne (–1926)
 Benjamin Franklin Thomas (1850–1911)
 Dawson Turner (1857-1928)
 Tamonji Urano (1886–1954)
 Charles Vaillant (1872–1942)
 Ivanova-Podobed Sofia Vasilievna (1887–1953)
 Harry Fuller Waite (1872–1946)
 Hugh Walsham
 Louis Andrew Weigel (1854–1906)
 John Duncan White (?–1955)
 John Chisholm Williams
 Ernest Wilson (1871-1911)
 J. Young

References

Further reading 

 

Monuments and memorials in Germany
X-ray pioneers
1936 establishments in Germany
Stone sculptures in Germany
Outdoor sculptures in Germany